NXT TakeOver: Vengeance Day was the 33rd NXT TakeOver and ninth Vengeance professional wrestling pay-per-view (PPV) and livestreaming event produced by WWE. It was held exclusively for wrestlers from the promotion's NXT brand division. The event took place on February 14, 2021, from the Capitol Wrestling Center, hosted at the WWE Performance Center in Orlando, Florida. The event revived WWE's old Vengeance PPV name, thus being the first Vengeance held since 2011. The event's name was also a play on Valentine's Day, as the event was held on the same day as the holiday. It was the first Vengeance to air on WWE's online streaming service, the WWE Network, which launched in February 2014, as well as the final NXT TakeOver event and final Vengeance to air on the American version of the WWE Network before its merger under Peacock in March. It would also be the final Vengeance to air on PPV, as the following year's event was held as a television special, and while the 2023 event returned to livestreaming, NXT's major events as of the 2022 calendar year no longer air on PPV, just livestreaming.

Five matches were contested at the event. In the main event, Finn Bálor defeated Pete Dunne to retain the NXT Championship. On the undercard, MSK (Nash Carter and Wes Lee) defeated Grizzled Young Veterans (James Drake and Zack Gibson) to win the Men's Dusty Rhodes Tag Team Classic, while in the opening bout, Dakota Kai and Raquel González defeated Ember Moon and Shotzi Blackheart to win the inaugural Women's Dusty Rhodes Tag Team Classic. Vengeance Day also marked the WWE return of LA Knight, who previously performed as Slate Randall from 2013 to 2014 and was known as Eli Drake in Impact Wrestling.

Production

Background 
TakeOver was a series of professional wrestling shows that began in May 2014, as WWE's NXT brand held their second WWE Network-exclusive event, billed as TakeOver. In subsequent months, the "TakeOver" moniker became the brand used by WWE for all of their NXT live specials. While originally exclusive to the WWE Network, NXT TakeOver events also became available on traditional pay-per-view beginning with TakeOver 31 in October 2020.

Vengeance Day was scheduled as the 33rd NXT TakeOver event. It revived WWE's old Vengeance pay-per-view, which had been produced annually from 2001 to 2007 with a one-off show in 2011. In 2021, WWE resurrected Vengeance as an NXT TakeOver event, making it the ninth in the Vengeance chronology, the first since 2011, the first brand-exclusive Vengeance since 2006, and the first Vengeance to air on the WWE Network in addition to traditional PPV. The name of the event was also a play on Valentine's Day, as the event was held on February 14, 2021, the same day as the holiday.

Impact of the COVID-19 pandemic 
As a result of the COVID-19 pandemic that began affecting the industry in mid-March 2020, WWE had to present the majority of its programming from a behind closed doors set. NXT's programming was initially held at NXT's home base of Full Sail University in Winter Park, Florida. In October 2020, NXT's events were moved to the WWE Performance Center in Orlando, Florida, featuring the "Capitol Wrestling Center" setup, an homage to the Capitol Wrestling Corporation, the predecessor to WWE. Like the WWE ThunderDome utilized for Raw and SmackDown's programming, LED boards were placed around the Performance Center so that fans could attend virtually, while additionally, friends and family members of the wrestlers were in attendance, along with a limited number of actual live fans, divided from each other by plexiglass walls.

Storylines 

The card included matches that resulted from scripted storylines, where wrestlers portrayed heroes, villains, or less distinguishable characters that built tension and culminated in a wrestling match or series of matches. Results were predetermined by WWE's writers on the NXT brand, while storylines were produced on their weekly television program, NXT.

On the February 3 episode of NXT, Pete Dunne demanded NXT Champion Finn Bálor give him a title match. Bálor then came to the ring and told Dunne he would get his match at Vengeance Day. Men's Royal Rumble winner Edge then came to the ring. He spoke about how seeing the drive, passion, and focus on wrestling in NXT helped motivate him to make his comeback. He said he had never held the NXT Championship and told Bálor and Dunne that he would be watching their match at Vengeance Day, and regardless of who won, it may help him decide which world championship he would challenge for at WrestleMania 37.

In January 2021, the sixth Dusty Rhodes Tag Team Classic was announced, and for the first time, a women's version was also announced. The finals of both the men's and women's tournaments were scheduled for Vengeance Day.

Event

Preliminary matches 
The pay-per-view opened with the finals of the first-ever women's Dusty Rhodes Tag Team Classic between the team of Ember Moon and Shotzi Blackheart and the team of Dakota Kai and Raquel González. The match was fast-paced and largely competitive throughout; only Kai was isolated by the opposing tag team for any prolonged stretch, though she was eventually able to tag in González. Kai hit her sunset flip backbreaker finisher (called the "Kai-ro-practor") for a nearfall, as did Blackheart with her signature finishing senton. Kai and González also utilied a double-team version of Kai's "Go 2 Kick" signature maneuver, which involves elevating the opponent before dropping them and kicking them in the face as they fall. The end of the match came when González tossed Moon from the entrance ramp, enabling her and Kai to focus on Blackheart. González hit Blackheart with her one-arm powerbomb finisher, and both she and Kai made the cover for the decisive pinfall. This made Kai and González the tournament champions and recipients of a future opportunity at the WWE Women's Tag Team Championship.

Next came the NXT North American Championship match, the champion Johnny Gargano defending against Kushida. Kushida held the offensive advantage for the majority of the match, targeting Gargano's left arm. This both set up Kushida's "Hoverboard Lock" finisher and impaired the left-handed Gargano from executing normal offence like punches and chops. Gargano in turn was able work over Kushida's head and neck to set up his own "One Final Beat" (slingshot DDT) finisher. In the finishing sequence, Kushida hit a running kick to Gargano's arm while the two were on the entrance ramp (which, in contrast to most WWE events, was level with the ring apron) and locked in the Hoverboard Lock in the ring. Gargano managed to stand and entangle Kushida's neck in the ropes, forcing him to release the hold. Gargano then hit "One Final Beat" twice - first from the inside of the ring to the entrance ramp, and secondly from the ramp to the inside of the ring, successfully securing the victory and retaining the championship.

MSK, the team of Nash Carter and Wes Lee, then faced the Grizzled Young Veterans, the team of James Drake and Zack Gibson, in the finals of the men's Dusty Rhodes Tag Team Classic. The match was fast-paced and full of innovative spots, including the Veterans performing a version of the Road Warriors' "Doomsday Device" outside the ring as Gibson held Carter on his shoulders as Drake dove through the ropes to perform a clothesline and knock him down. Drake also performed a 450 splash, noted as a maneuver not often utilized by the "no nonsense" team, for a nearfall. Though the Veterans isolated Carter for large portions of the match, he eventually tagged in Lee and the two performed some double-team maneuvers of their own, including an aided standing moonsault where Carter jumped clean over a crouching Drake to land on Gibson. The finish came when the Veterans attempted to perform their "Ticket to Mayhem" tandem finisher on Carter, only for Lee to break it up. He then tagged himself into the match and MSK performed an elevated corkscrew blockbuster onto Drake, this move earning the pinfall to make them tournament champions and earn a future match for the NXT Tag Team Championship.

The triple threat match for the NXT Women's Championship followed, champion Io Shirai defending against Mercedes Martinez and Toni Storm. Martinez was the aggressor early in the match, beginning her assault on her opponents before ring introductions were even made. The match kept a high pace throughout, and all three women hit their finishers. Shirai also executed a dive off the rigging for some of the stage lights onto both opponents on the arena floor. Another notable spot featured Martinez executing a release German suplex from the top rope to Storm, only to become entangled in the ropes herself and allow Shirai to hit her in the "tree of woe" position with a diving double foot stop. Shortly after hitting her "Storm Zero" finisher on Martinez for a nearfall, Storm (who seldom uses aerial maneuvers) followed with a top rope diving headbutt. As she went for the cover, Shirai hit her signature "Over the Moon-sault" on both opponents, pinning Martinez to win the match and retain the championship.

Main event 
The main event for the NXT Championship between the champion Finn Bálor and challenger Pete Dunne followed, the first time the two had ever wrestled in any sort of match together, let alone one-on-one. Dunne repeatedly used joint manipulation on Bálor, splitting his fingers and bending his wrist in unnatural positions. He came close to winning the championship on multiple occasions, including executing his pump handle mat slam finisher (called "The Bitter End") for a nearfall. He attempted to use the move a second time, only for Bálor to reverse it into a version of his own "1916" finisher (an elevated DDT), also for a nearfall. At the finish, Bálor hit his diving double stomp finisher (known as the "Coup de Grace") and segued it into a standard version of the "1916," this combination earning the pinfall and retaining him the championship.

After the match, Dunne's stablemates (and NXT Tag Team Champions) Danny Burch and Oney Lorcan rushed the ring and assaulted Bálor, who had little capacity to fight back after a grueling championship bout. After moments, The Undisputed Era (represented by Adam Cole, Roderick Strong, and Bálor's recent rival Kyle O'Reilly) ran in to fend them off. As Cole and Strong stared Dunne, Burch, and Lorcan away from the ring, O'Reilly helped Bálor to his feet and it appeared the show would conclude with the four of them standing in the ring together. Cole then executed a superkick on Bálor, the champion immediately falling to the mat. As O'Reilly began to protest, Cole superkicked him as well, leaving him prone as well, then left the ring. The show went off the air with Cole storming away from the ring and Strong standing in the ring next to the fallen Bálor and O'Reilly, looking back and forth between the two sides.

Reception 
Wrestling journalist Dave Meltzer of Wrestling Observer Newsletter was highly positive toward each of the event's matches, giving 4 stars to the women's tag team match, 4.75 stars to the NXT North American Championship match, 4.5 stars to the men's tag team match, 3.75 stars to the women's triple threat, and 4.5 stars to the main event. The event also received a 10.0 "Virtually Perfect" rating from Kevin Pantoja of 411Mania.

Aftermath 
Kyle O'Reilly opened the February 17 episode of NXT, demanding an explanation from Adam Cole. Roderick Strong emerged, trying to play peacemaker, which O'Reilly didn't accept. Finn Bálor also appeared in this segment, blaming O'Reilly for Cole's attack on him. The three were forced into partnership in the night's main event against Pete Dunne, Danny Burch, and Oney Lorcan, a match they lost after further sneak attacks by Cole. The following week, Cole appeared to express remorse for his actions and a desire to reconcile with Strong, only to low blow him and rip Strong's Undisputed Era dog tags from his neck, cementing his heel turn and split from what remained of the group. For his match with Bálor on March 3, Strong made his ring entrance to different music and without any Undisputed Era logos or colors on his gear. For his own match with the NXT Champion the following week, Cole did enter to the familiar Undisputed Era theme and with Undisputed Era-tinged wrestling gear, having claimed that the group would only die when he said so and that by attacking O'Reilly and Strong he had merely cut dead weight. At the conclusion of the match, O'Reilly appeared and ripped Cole's Undisputed Era armband off. On March 24, in the contract signing for their unsanctioned match at TakeOver: Stand & Deliver, both men spoke of the group in the past tense, suggesting it had finally become defunct.

MSK and the team of Dakota Kai and Raquel González were presented with the trophy for winning their respective Dusty Rhodes Tag Team Classic tournaments later on February 17. It was originally announced that their respective tag team championship opportunities would both occur on March 3, though Wes Lee was later discovered to have sustained a legitimate broken hand at TakeOver, thus delaying MSK's title shot. WWE Women's Tag Team Champions (and NXT alumnae) Nia Jax and Shayna Baszler made an appearance in the segment, trading promos with their upcoming opponents. When the March 3 match ended in a controversial finish favoring Jax and Baszler, the NXT Women's Tag Team Championship was commissioned the week after, being first awarded to Kai and González by virtue of their Dusty Cup championship. However, afterwards, they were confronted by the runner-ups, Shotzi Blackheart and Ember Moon, setting up a match between the two teams for the titles later that night, where Moon and Blackheart were victorious, ending Kai and González's reign at 56 minutes, the shortest reign in the title's history.

Toni Storm was also shown to have disrupted a photo shoot for Io Shirai, attacking the NXT Women's Champion. The following week, she challenged Shirai to a one-on-one match for the championship after Shirai had just defeated newcomer Zoey Stark, pointing out that Shirai did not defeat Storm herself at TakeOver and had in fact never done so. The match was made for March 10, where Shirai retained.

On January 25, 2021, WWE announced that the WWE Network would become exclusively distributed by Peacock in the United States as part of a new agreement with NBCUniversal, which airs Monday Night Raw and NXT on the USA Network. On March 18, the WWE Network became a premium channel under Peacock, with premium subscribers to the service receiving access to the WWE Network at no additional cost. As a result, Vengeance Day was the final NXT TakeOver, as well as the final Vengeance, to air on the American version of the WWE Network before it merged under Peacock. After a brief transitional period, the standalone version of the WWE Network in the U.S. shut down on April 4, with future events only available via Peacock's WWE Network channel and traditional PPV. This did not affect other countries, which maintain the separate WWE Network service distributed by WWE.

In September 2021, NXT was rebranded as NXT 2.0, returning the brand to its original function as WWE's developmental territory. The NXT TakeOver series was subsequently discontinued. Vengeance Day continued on as its own event, however, with the 2022 event held as a special episode of NXT instead of airing on PPV or via livestreaming. The 2022 event in turn established Vengeance Day as NXT's annual Valentine's event. This was also the last Vengeance to air on PPV, as while the 2022 event was held as a television special, the 2023 event returned to livestreaming, although not PPV, as beginning with the 2022 calendar year, NXT's major events no longer air on PPV, just livestreaming.

Results

Dusty Rhodes Tag Team Classic bracket

Notes

References

External links
 
 

Vengeance Day
WWE Vengeance
2021 WWE Network events
2021 WWE pay-per-view events
2021 in professional wrestling in Florida
Events in Orlando, Florida
February 2021 events in the United States
Impact of the COVID-19 pandemic on television
Professional wrestling in Orlando, Florida